Barr Township (T11N R9W) is located in Macoupin County, Illinois, USA. As of the 2010 census, its population was 329 and it contained 155 housing units.

Geography

Demographics

Adjacent townships
 Scottville Township (north)
 North Palmyra Township (northeast)
 South Palmyra Township (east)
 Bird Township (southeast)
 Western Mound Township (south)
 Rockbridge Township, Greene County (southwest)
 Rubicon Township, Greene County (west)
 Athensville Township, Greene County (northwest)

References

External links
City-data.com
Illinois State Archives

Townships in Macoupin County, Illinois
Townships in Illinois